Doyle Glass (born January 22, 1962) is an American author, historian, and sculptor. He is a writer of fact-based narrative nonfiction works as well as historical nonfiction based on individual, first-hand accounts. As a sculptor, he designed and created the Kentucky Medal of Honor Memorial in Louisville, KY, and the Texas Medal of Honor Memorial in Gainesville, TX.

Biography
Glass was born and raised in Midland, Texas. the fifth generation of a pioneer West Texas ranching family. He developed a life-long passion for writing and art.

After graduating from Midland High School in 1980, Glass attended Southern Methodist University in Dallas where he obtained a BA in history. In 1988, he graduated from Southern Methodist University Dedman School of Law with a Juris Doctor degree. In the early 1990s, Glass worked as an assistant district attorney in McLennan County, Texas and Bell County, Texas. In 1994, he moved to Kentucky and began work as a special prosecutor with the Kentucky Attorney General's office. In 2001, he left the practice of law and began work as an author, historian, and sculptor. In 2015, he returned to his native Texas and now resides in Dallas. Glass’ greatest pride is being a loving husband to his wife Somer and father to his son Jake and daughters Atty and Myra Lee.

Sculptor
In 2000, he conceived of and sculpted the Kentucky Medal of Honor Memorial , a bronze statue of John Squires, a Kentucky recipient of the Medal of Honor in WWII. The statue stands in downtown Louisville, and serves as a reminder of the sacrifices of heroes from Kentucky who have fought and died for freedom.

In 2008, he designed and sculpted the Texas Medal of Honor Memorial. a bronze statue of Midland native George O'Brien Jr., who earned the Medal of Honor during the Korean War. The memorial, soon to be part of the Texas Medal of Honor Museum in Gainesville, stands as a symbol of all Texans who have earned our nation's highest award for combat valor.

Author and historian
Inspired by Stephen Ambrose's book-turned-HBO miniseries Band of Brothers, Glass began writing historical narrative nonfiction.

in 2007, Glass wrote Lions of Medina, a true, first-hand account of the Marines of Charlie Company 1/1 during the Vietnam War. The work is based on individual interviews with the survivors of Operation Medina in 1967. It was first published by Coleche Press in 2007, and subsequently published by NAL Caliber Penguin in 2008.

His second book, Swift Sword, was published in 2014. It tells the story of Marines who endured a twenty-four hour fire-fight on a lone knoll in the Que Son Valley during the Vietnam War. As with Lions of Medina, the work is based on interviews with survivors of Operation Swift in 1967.

Glass' next book, Benoist's War, is based on the life of Robert Benoist, a French racing champion in Grand Prix and Le Mans in the 1920s and 30s. Benoist became a secret agent and saboteur in Nazi occupied France for the British Special Operations Executive during WWII. Writing from the point of view of Benoist, Glass will combine creative storytelling with historical fact in order to place the reader in the skin of the man who risked everything to free France of the Nazi menace.

References

External links
Doyle Glass Sculpture Website

1962 births
Living people
People from Midland, Texas
21st-century American historians
American male non-fiction writers
20th-century American sculptors
Dedman School of Law alumni
Historians from Texas
21st-century American male writers
21st-century American sculptors